Bruce Robinson is an English director and actor.

Bruce Robinson may also refer to:

Bruce Robinson (baseball) (born 1954), Major League Baseball catcher
Bruce Robinson (civil servant)
Bruce A. Robinson, founder Ontario Consultants on Religious Tolerance